Aron Naumovich Trainin  Moshe Aron Naumovich Trainin  Moshe Aron Nahimovich Trainin ( – 7 February 1957) was a Soviet jurist and criminologist. 

From 1916 to 1917 he was an editor of the Jewish newspaper . He was a founding member of the Moscow chapter of the Political Red Cross, which was formed in 1918.

Trainin came to prominence in the inter-war years as critical of the League of Nations for not doing enough to prosecute the those who waged war against peace. Scholars Francine Hirsch of the University of Wisconsin–Madison, Kirsten Sellars of the National University of Singapore, and Michelle Jean Penn of the University of Colorado Boulder credit him with establishing the international legal concept of "crimes against peace". In 1937 Trainin published his 'The Defense of Peace and Criminal Law' in which he castigated the League of Nations for failing to make aggressive war a criminal offense and not providing for any sort of international court to punish aggressors.  Along with Major-General Iona Timofeevich Nikitchenko, who also served as a judge, Trainin was a signatory for the Soviet Union to the charter of the Allies of World War II War Crimes Executive Committee which established the Nüremberg International Military Tribunal for "the prosecution and punishment of the major war criminals of the European Axis", known in Russian as the "London Agreement", ''.

Trainin played a central role in establishing the legal framework for the Nuremberg Trials. He proposed that a new legal concept, "the crime of aggression", be used to hold Nazi Germany's military and political leadership accountable for the numerous countries they invaded and occupied. Along with the other jurists involved in crafting the Nuremberg Charter, Trainin was influential in establishing the new legal field of international law. Despite this foundational role, his contributions are often ignored or forgotten by Western scholars, largely as a result of Cold War perceptions of the Soviet Union. More recent scholarship has begun to acknowledge the influence of Soviet legal thought on international law, arguing that Trainin's contributions must be taken seriously, alongside an ongoing recognition of the crimes of the Soviet regime.

Trainin later became a Corresponding member of the Academy of Sciences of the USSR (1946). In 1947 and 1948 he served as vice-president of the International Association of Democratic Lawyers. His major works were On Complicity (1941) and Elements of a Crime According to Soviet Criminal Law (1951).

In 1945, in Fundamental Principles of Soviet Criminal Law, he wrote,

Trainin was awarded two Orders of the Red Banner of Labor.

See also
 History of the Jews in the Soviet Union

References

1883 births
1957 deaths
20th-century jurists
20th-century Russian lawyers
Criminology educators
Academics from the Russian Empire
Editors from the Russian Empire
Jews from the Russian Empire
Lawyers from the Russian Empire
Jewish educators
Jewish human rights activists
Jewish writers from the Russian Empire
Jewish journalists
Jewish non-fiction writers
Russian legal scholars
Russian newspaper editors
Russian professors
Soviet Jews
Soviet jurists
Moscow State University alumni
Academic staff of Moscow State University
People from Kaluga
Writers from Moscow